Delfín Mosibe Esara (born 2 July 1992), sportingly known as Delfi, is an Equatoguinean footballer. He plays for Springvale White Eagles FC in NPL 2 Victoria as a midfielder.

Early life
Delfi has born in Ruiche, a neighbourhood located in Luba, Bioko Sur to a Bubi family. He was just two years when his mother left the country for the Spanish Community of Madrid.

Career
After playing in the youth teams of Real Madrid (Juvenils C & B) and Real Valladolid (Juvenil A), in 2011, Delfi went to Italy, where he has disputed friendly matches with Gubbio and Voluntas Spoleto, but, because of problems with the international transfer he could not sign with any team, opting to return to Spain the following year. Back in Spain, Delfi played league matches, both Betis San Isidro and Atlético Ibañés. In 2013, he has signed for Werribee City, becoming the first ever Equatoguinean footballer who plays in an Australian club.

International career
Delfi was called for play with the Equatorial Guinea national team a friendly match against Estonia on 6 June 2009. The match marked his international début and saw him come on before the start of the second half.

References

External links

1992 births
Living people
People from Luba, Equatorial Guinea
Equatoguinean emigrants to Spain
Equatoguinean footballers
Association football midfielders
Equatorial Guinea international footballers
Divisiones Regionales de Fútbol players
Equatoguinean expatriate footballers
Equatoguinean expatriate sportspeople in Australia
Expatriate soccer players in Australia
Bubi people
Altona Magic SC players
Caroline Springs George Cross FC players